Brian Gibson is the name of:

Brian Gibson (director) (1944–2004), English film director
Brian Gibson (musician) (born 1975), American musician
Brian Gibson (politician) (1936–2017), Australian politician
Brian Gibson (footballer) (1928–2010), Irish professional footballer

See also
Brian Gibbons (disambiguation)
Bryan Gibson (born 1947), Canadian retired boxer
Bryan Gibson (musician) (born 1980), American producer and composer
Gibson (surname)